SIIMA Award for Best Actress – Telugu is presented by Vibri media group as part of its annual South Indian International Movie Awards, for best acting done by an actress in Telugu films. The award was first given in 2012 for films released in 2011. Shruti Haasan is the most awarded with 3 times winning the award and Samantha Ruth Prabhu is the most nominated with 8 nominations.

Superlatives

Winners

Nominations 

2011: Nayanathara – Sri Rama Rajyam
Samantha Ruth Prabhu – Dookudu
Kajal Aggarwal – Mr. Perfect
Hansika Motwani – Kandireega
Tamannaah – 100% Love 
2012: Shruti Haasan – Gabbar SinghNayantara – Krishnam Vande Jagadgurum 
Kajal Aggarwal – Businessman
Tamannaah – Racha
Samantha Ruth Prabhu – Eega2013: Samantha Ruth Prabhu – Attarintiki DarediShruti Haasan – Balupu
Nithya Menen – Gunde Jaari Gallanthayyinde
Tamannaah – Tadakha
Kajal Aggarwal – Baadshah 2014: Shruti Haasan – Race GurramNayantara – Anamika
Rakul Preet Singh – Loukyam 
Kajal Agarwal – Govindudu Andarivadele
Samantha Ruth Prabhu – Manam2015: Shruti Haasan – SrimanthuduNithya Menen – Malli Malli Idi Rani Roju
Anushka Shetty – Rudramadevi
Lakshmi Manchu – Dongata 
Samantha Ruth Prabhu – S/O Satyamurthy2016: Rakul Preet Singh – Nannaku PremathoLavanya Tripathi – Srirastu Subhamastu
Regina Cassandra – Jo Achyutananda
Ritu Varma – Pelli Choopulu 
Samantha Akkineni – A Aa2017: Kajal Aggarwal – Nene Raju Nene Mantri  
Anushka Shetty – Baahubali 2: The Conclusion
Rakul Preet Singh – Jaya Janaki Nayaka
Sai Pallavi – Fidaa2018: Keerthi Suresh – MahanatiAditi Rao Hydari – Sammohanam
Anushka Shetty – Bhaagamathie
Rashmika Mandanna – Geetha Govindam
Samantha Akkineni – Rangasthalam2019: Samantha Akkineni –  Oh! BabyPooja Hegde – Maharshi
Shraddha Srinath – Jersey
Rashmika Mandanna – Dear Comrade
Raashi Khanna – Prati Roju Pandage2020: Pooja Hegde – Ala VaikunthapurramulooRashmika Mandanna – Sarileru Neekevvaru
Chandini Chowdary – Colour Photo
Nabha Natesh – Solo Brathuke So Better
Aishwarya Rajesh – World Famous Lover2021: Pooja Hegde – Most Eligible Bachelor'Rashmika Mandanna – Pushpa: The RiseShruti Haasan – KrackPriyamani – NarappaPragya Jaiswal – Akhanda''

See also 

 Tollywood

References

Best Actress Telugu
South Indian International Movie Awards winners
Awards for actresses